Llandenny is a village in Monmouthshire, south east Wales, United Kingdom. Llandenny is located three miles south of Raglan and three miles north of Usk.

History and amenities 
The little village of Llandenny is just a few houses, a pub (the Raglan Arms) and the Church of St John, named after St John the Apostle and Evangelist. The main south Wales to the Midlands road link, the A449, passes close to the village.

The Raglan Arms was named for Lord Raglan who owned the nearby Cefn Tilla Court until it was sold in 2015, following the death of Fitzroy Somerset in 2010. A landlord of the pub in the 1930s was Frank Wake who catered nearly always for the farm labourers and not the gentry so it became a 'thorn in the flesh' of the Raglan family.

The nearby Llandenny railway station building (photographed) existed for many years until it was converted into a residential property. It included a ground frame signal box on the platform, a cattle dock and small goods sidings. It stood on the Coleford, Monmouth, Usk and Pontypool Railway line and closed in 1959.

Notes

External links

 Genuki info on Llandenny

Villages in Monmouthshire